Ahl Al Esheg is the second studio album by Lebanese pop singer-songwriter Diana Haddad, released by Stallions Records on February 10, 1997. In terms of sales, Ahl Al Esheg is Haddad's third best-selling studio album behind Ammanih and Saken which were certified platinum by Stallions Records. The album was released in several editions and was supported by several appearances at festivals across the Arab world. Emirates FM awarded her best female artist and best album. In late 1997, she received a nomination for the best Arabic female artist in the magazine Al Ryada Wal Shabab.

Background and recording
Although Haddad is married to Khaliji director Suhail Al-Abdul, there is no Khaliji song on the album; Haddad wanted to introduce herself as a Lebanese Popstar.

Haddad recorded more than six tracks for the album. Haddad and Al-Abdul began to write the songs for the album during Sakens era. The track "Anida", written and produced by Emad Shams Al Din, was released as the album's first (promo only) single. "Anida" was originally intended to be on Saken. The single "Ammanih", which was on Ahl Al Esheg, was later released as the lead single of her third album, Ammanih.

Promotion
The album played on Arabic TV channels such as the Middle East Broadcasting Center, Arab Radio and Television Network, and the Lebanese Broadcasting Corporation; it was also on the Top 20 charts.

Dubai had billboards of Haddad, paid for by her record label, to promote the album. The album was certified Multiplatinum in the Arab World, including United Arab Emirates and Lebanon.

Track listing
"Bizal Minak" (Samir Nakhla, Emad Shams Al Din, Ali Safa, Diana Haddad) – 5:10 Lebanese Arabic"Wilfi Gafani" (Adel Raffol, Salim Salama, Ellie Al Alia) – 5:54
"Tafh El Keil" (Emad Shams Al Din, Ehsan Al Monther, Diana Haddad) – 5:23
"Ya Samieen El Sout" (Ellie Bitar, George Mardosian) – 5:16
"Anida" (Emad Shams Al Din, Robir Aram) – 5:15
"Ahl El Ishq" (Safoh Shegala, George Mardosian, Rojih Khori) – 6:39 Bedouin Arabic'''Credits and personnel

Production

 Diana Haddad: vocals
 Salim Salama: acoustic guitar
 Emad Shams Al Din: conductor
 Ehsan Al Monther: violin
 George Mardosian: percussion
 Safoh Shegala: cello
 Rojih Khori: violin
 Ellie Bitar: violin
 Salim Salama: drums, keyboard, piano
 Salim Salama: piano
 Ali Safa: violin

 Walid Baghdai: keyboard
 Joe Barojian: keyboard
 George Mardosian: guitar, keyboard, piano
 George Mardosian: guitar
 Suhail Al Abdoul: production

Formats
These are the formats of major album releases of Ahl Al Esheg''.

References

Diana Haddad albums
1997 albums